Marquis E of Jin was the fourteenth ruler of the State of Jin. He was also the fourth ruler of Jin in the Spring and Autumn period. He reigned for six years.

According to the Records of the Grand Historian, when Zhuang Bo of Quwo heard the news of the death of Marquis E of Jin, he brought troops to attack Jin. King Huan of Zhou ordered the Duke of Guo (虢公) to attack Count Zhuang of Quwo so Count Zhuang retreated back to Quwo. The Jin people asked the son of Marquis E of Jin, Guang, to ascend the throne and he became the next ruler of Jin: Marquis Ai of Jin.

The Zuo Zhuan has a different record of the event. It says that Count Zhuang of Quwo had an alliance with the state of Zheng and the state of Xing (邢) and they attacked Yi (翼), the capital of Jin. King Huan of Zhou sent troops to help Quwo so Marquis E fled. Soon afterwards Count Zhuang betrayed Huan of Zhou and attacked him. King Huan then sent the Duke of Guo (虢公) during the autumn of that year to attack Quwo and to put the son of Marquis E of Jin, Guang, on the throne of Jin and Guang became Marquis Ai of Jin.

Notes 

Monarchs of Jin (Chinese state)
8th-century BC Chinese monarchs
718 BC deaths